The North Laramie River is a tributary of the Laramie River,  long, in southeastern Wyoming in the United States.

It rises in the Medicine Bow National Forest in the Laramie Mountains, in northern Albany County.

See also
List of Wyoming rivers

References

Rivers of Wyoming
Rivers of Albany County, Wyoming